Jill McGown (9 August 1947 in Campbeltown, Scotland – 6 April 2007 in Kettering, Northamptonshire) was a British writer of mystery novels. She was best known for her mystery series featuring Inspector Lloyd and Judy Hill, one of which (A Shred of Evidence) was made into a television drama in 2001 starring Philip Glenister and Michelle Collins. McGown wrote her first mystery novel after being laid off from the British Steel Corporation in 1980. She is sometimes credited as Elizabeth Chaplin.

Bibliography

Lloyd & Hill
 A Perfect Match (1983)
 Redemption (aka Murder at the Old Vicarage) (1988)
 Death of a Dancer (aka Gone to Her Death) (1989)
 The Murders of Mrs Austin And Mrs Beale (1991)
 The Other Woman (1992)
 Murder... Now And Then (1993)
 A Shred of Evidence (1995)
 Verdict Unsafe (1997)
 Picture of Innocence (1998)
 Plots And Errors (1999)
 Scene of Crime (2001)
 Births, Deaths and Marriages (aka Death in the Family) (2002)
 Unlucky for Some (2004

Standalone novels
 Record of Sin (1985)
 An Evil Hour (1986)
 The Stalking Horse (1987)
 Murder Movie (1990)
 Hostage to Fortune (1992) (writing as Elizabeth Chaplin)

External links

Jill McGown's website
 Obituary: 
 Obituary: 
 Obituary: 

1947 births
2007 deaths
British mystery writers
People from Campbeltown
Women mystery writers
20th-century British novelists
20th-century women writers
People from Kettering
People from Corby